Southold Historic District is a national historic district located at the hamlet of Southold in Suffolk County, New York. The district has 86 contributing buildings, one contributing site, and two contributing objects.  The majority are residential buildings built either with a heavy timber frame or balloon frame construction and range in date from about 1656 to about 1938.  The district also includes three prominent religious facilities and educational facilities.

It was added to the National Register of Historic Places in 1997.

References

Historic districts on the National Register of Historic Places in New York (state)
Georgian architecture in New York (state)
Historic districts in Suffolk County, New York
National Register of Historic Places in Suffolk County, New York